The Latvia national under-18 football team are a feeder team for the main Latvia national football team.
 The following players were named in the last squad for the friendly match against Belarus U18s on 20 July 2013.

Goalkeepers

Defenders

Midfielders

Forwards

See also
Latvia national football team
Latvia national under-21 football team
Latvia national under-19 football team
Latvia national under-17 football team

References

External links
 Official website 
 Latvia national team results at Rec.Sport.Soccer Statistics Foundation
 Latvia national team most capped players and highest goalscorers at Rec.Sport.Soccer Statistics Foundation
 Latvia official profile at Unions of European Football Associations

European national under-18 association football teams
Under-18